Bjorn Fratangelo is the defending champion, but did not compete, choosing to play in the RBC Tennis Championships of Dallas instead.

Blake Mott won the title, defeating Andrey Golubev in the final 6–7(4–7) , 6–1, 6–2

Seeds

Draw

Finals

Top half

Bottom half

References
 Main Draw
 Qualifying Draw

Launceston Tennis International - Singles
2016 Men's Singles
2016 in Australian tennis